is a 1997 Japanese criminal action comedy-drama film directed and written by Hiroyuki Tanaka under the name Sabu. The film features Shin'ichi Tsutsumi, Keisuke Horibe, Ren Ohsugi and Kyōko Tōyama in the lead roles. It tells the story of a postman (Shin'ichi Tsutsumi) who is mistaken by the police as a criminal.

The film was released in Japan in 1997 and later in Italy in 1999 and Brazil in 2003. Hiroyuki Tanaka won the New Blood award at the 1999 Cognac Festival du Film Policier for the film.

Plot
Sawaki (Shin'ichi Tsutsumi) is a postman. He has an old friend Noguchi (Keisuke Horibe) who, unknown to him, had become a yakuza. Noguchi was being spied by the police for a long time. One day Sawaki delivers a letter to him and stays at his place for a while. During his stay Noguchi puts a package of drugs into Sawaki's letter bag. His finger, which he cut off as a symbol of loyalty to his gang, also accidentally falls into the bag. Viewing his relationship with Noguchi, the police think that Sawaki is a member of the yakuza and follow him. On reaching home, Sawaki finds a suicide note in his bag written by a cancer patient to her aunt. He rushes to the hospital to see the girl Kyoko (Kyoko Toyama) and falls in love with her. He meets a hit man Joe (Ren Osugi) there who tells him how he had won the contract killing competition called the "Killer of killers". The police profiler (Tomoro Taguchi), who was following Sawaki, comes to the conclusion that Sawaki is a member of the criminal gang. Meanwhile, Naguchi discovers that the finger he had cut was no longer in his house. All this marked the beginning of problems for Sawaki.

Cast
Shin'ichi Tsutsumi as Sawaki
Kyōko Tōyama as Sayoko Kitagawa
Ren Osugi as Joe
Keisuke Horibe as Noguchi Shuji
Shimizu Hiroshi as Detective Domon Taizo
Takizawa Ryoko as Ran 
Tomorowo Taguchi as Profiler
Akaji Maro as Hanta

Reviews and reception

The film received mixed reviews from critics but was hailed as one of the best works of Hiroyuki Tanaka. The film was commercially successful and was declared a hit at the Japanese box office. Though the story appeared a bit complicated but the screenplay led the audience to enjoy the movie. The action and the dialogues of the movie were also appreciated. Cinematographer Kuriyama Shuji was appreciated for implementing the change of camera work from high action scenes to love scenes. The Japanese film critics praised the film by calling it ' both a superb parody of the gangster genre and a masterful exercise in style and storytelling.' 

The film also received negative reviews from a few foreign film critics. Peter Bradshaw of Theguardian.com called the film a "chaotic Yakuza thriller, which has a lot of energy and pace, but is let down by uncertain, and slightly callow, undertones of comic sentimentality." French critics said that "Postman Blues could have been an intelligent extension of his first film that surprised many people." It was even called a disappointment and an innocent black comedy.

Home video release
DVD of the film was released by Asian Film Network.

Awards

References

External links 

1997 films
Japanese comedy films
1990s crime comedy films
Films directed by Sabu
Films set in Japan
Yakuza films
1997 comedy films
1990s Japanese films